Mawlawi Mohammad Nabi Omari is a citizen of Afghanistan who was held for nearly twelve years in extrajudicial detention in the United States Guantanamo Bay detainment camps, in Cuba.
His Guantanamo Internment Serial Number was 832. American intelligence analysts estimate that he was born in 1968, in Khowst, Afghanistan. He arrived at the Guantanamo detention camps on October 28, 2002.

He was transported from Guantanamo Bay to Qatar on June 1, 2014.  Omari and four other men known as the Taliban five were exchanged for captured U.S. soldier Bowe Bergdahl. The men were held by the Qataris in a form of house arrest. The swap was brokered by the Tamim bin Hamad Al Thani Emir of Qatar. Omari and the others were required to stay in Qatar for a year as a condition of their release.

He is currently the Governor for Khost Province.

Official status reviews

Originally the Bush Presidency asserted that captives apprehended in the "war on terror" were not covered by the Geneva Conventions, and could be held indefinitely, without charge, and without an open and transparent review of the justifications for their detention.
In 2004 the United States Supreme Court ruled, in Rasul v. Bush, that Guantanamo captives were entitled to being informed of the allegations justifying their detention, and were entitled to try to refute them.

Office for the Administrative Review of Detained Enemy Combatants

Following the Supreme Court's ruling the Department of Defense set up the Office for the Administrative Review of Detained Enemy Combatants.

Scholars at the Brookings Institution, led by Benjamin Wittes, listed the captives still held in Guantanamo in December 2008, according to whether their detention was justified by certain common allegations:

 Mohammad Nabi Omari  was listed as one of the captives who the military alleges were members of either al Qaeda or the Taliban and associated with the other group.
 Mohammad Nabi Omari  was listed as one of the captives whose "names or aliases were found on material seized in raids on Al Qaeda safehouses and facilities."
 Mohammad Nabi Omari  was listed as one of the captives who was a member of the Taliban leadership.
 Mohammad Nabi Omari  was listed as one of "36 [captives who] openly admit either membership or significant association with Al Qaeda, the Taliban, or some other group the government considers militarily hostile to the United States."
 Mohammad Nabi Omari  was listed as one of the captives who admitted "serving Al Qaeda or the Taliban in some non-military capacity."

During his Combatant Status Review Tribunal Omari acknowledged he had worked for the Taliban, but claimed that was prior to 9-11.
He claimed that after the US invasion he had been a loyal supporter of the Hamid Karzai government, and that he had been a covert operative for a US intelligence officer he knew only as "Mark".

Formerly secret Joint Task Force Guantanamo assessment

On April 25, 2011, whistleblower organization WikiLeaks published formerly secret assessments drafted by Joint Task Force Guantanamo analysts.
WikiLeaks published an 11-page Joint Task Force Guantanamo assessment that had been drafted on January 28, 2008.
The assessment was signed by camp commandant Mark H. Buzby, who recommended continued detention.

Guantanamo Joint Task Force review

When he assumed office in January 2009, President Barack Obama made a number of promises about the future of Guantanamo. He promised the use of torture would cease at the camp.  He promised to institute a new review system.  That new review system was composed of officials from six departments, where the OARDEC reviews were conducted entirely by the Department of Defense.  When it reported back a year later, the Joint Review Task Force classified some individuals as too dangerous to be transferred from Guantanamo, even though there was no evidence to justify laying charges against them. On April 9, 2013, that document was made public after a Freedom of Information Act request.
Mohammed Nabi Omari was one of the 71 individuals deemed too innocent to charge, but too dangerous to release.
Although Obama promised that those deemed too innocent to charge, but too dangerous to release would start to receive reviews from a Periodic Review Board. Less than a quarter of men have received a review.

Transfer negotiations and post-hoc criticisms

Negotiations over exchanging Bowe Bergdahl for five Guantanamo went on for years. After the exchange, and after Bergdahl was charged with desertion, critics claimed the Obama did not inform Congress in advance, and so the transfer was illegal.
Critics claimed the men were likely to, certain to, or had already "re-engaged with terrorism"—even before their first year of house arrest was over.  On May 31, 2015, The New York Times quoted a State Department official who insisted on anonymity that Qatar had unofficially "agreed to maintain the current restrictive conditions". They reported that this further restriction would last for at least six months, while negotiations were finalized.

References

External links
 Who Are the Remaining Prisoners in Guantánamo? Part Eight: Captured in Afghanistan (2002-07) Andy Worthington
 The Guantánamo Files: Website Extras (11) – The Last of the Afghans (Part One) and Six “Ghost Prisoners” Andy Worthington

Detainees of the Guantanamo Bay detention camp
Afghan extrajudicial prisoners of the United States
Living people
1968 births
People from Khost